A coffer (or coffering) in  architecture is a series of sunken panels in the shape of a square, rectangle, or octagon in a ceiling, soffit or vault.  
A series of these sunken panels was often used as decoration for a ceiling or a vault, also called caissons ("boxes"), or lacunaria ("spaces, openings"), so that a coffered ceiling can be called a lacunar ceiling: the strength of the structure is in the framework of the coffers.

History
The stone coffers of the ancient Greeks and Romans are the earliest surviving examples, but a seventh-century BC Etruscan chamber tomb in the necropolis of San Giuliano, which is cut in soft tufa-like stone reproduces a ceiling with beams and cross-beams lying on them, with flat panels filling the lacunae. For centuries, it was thought that wooden coffers were first made by crossing the wooden beams of a ceiling in the Loire Valley châteaux of the early Renaissance. In 2012, however, archaeologists working under the Packard Humanities Institute at the House of the Telephus in Herculaneum discovered that wooden coffered ceilings were constructed in Roman times. Experimentation with the possible shapes in coffering, which solve problems of mathematical tiling, or tessellation, were a feature of Islamic as well as Renaissance architecture. The more complicated problems of diminishing the scale of the individual coffers were presented by the requirements of curved surfaces of vaults and domes.

A prominent example of Roman coffering, employed to lighten the weight of the dome, can be found in the ceiling of the rotunda dome in the Pantheon, Rome.

Asian architecture
In ancient Chinese wooden architecture, coffering is known as zaojing.

Gallery

See also

 Dome
 Dropped ceiling
 Cove ceiling
 Beam ceiling

Footnotes

External links

U.S. National Capitol

Ceilings
Architectural elements